Toshiaki Sakai (born 9 April 1974) is a Japanese former professional tennis player.

A left-handed player from Tokyo, Sakai made his only ATP Tour main draw appearances at the 1995 Japan Open, but didn't begin competing professionally until 2002.

Sakai, who is the son of Universiade champion Toshiro Sakai, was a student at Keio University and represented Japan at the 1995 Summer Universiade. He won the All Japan Student Tennis Championships singles title in 1996.

On the professional tour, Sakai reached a best singles ranking of 468 in the world and featured in the qualifying draw for the 2003 Australian Open. He had a best doubles world ranking of 517.

References

External links
 
 

1974 births
Living people
Japanese male tennis players
Competitors at the 1995 Summer Universiade
Sportspeople from Tokyo
20th-century Japanese people